"Perchance to Dream" is the 26th episode of Batman: The Animated Series. It was written by noted horror author Joe R. Lansdale and originally aired on October 19, 1992. In this episode, Bruce Wayne awakes in a seemingly idyllic dream world in which his parents are still alive and someone else is Batman. The title is taken from the famous soliloquy from Shakespeare's Hamlet.

Plot
Batman pursues a group of criminals into a warehouse where he is blinded by a flash of light and knocked unconscious. He awakens in bed as Bruce Wayne, with no memory of how he came to be there.

It becomes clear that something is very wrong: there is no Batcave beneath Wayne Manor, and Alfred knows nothing of Bruce's alter ego nor of Robin. Furthermore, Bruce's parents are still alive and he is engaged to Selina Kyle, who has no knowledge of her own double life as Catwoman. He can find no evidence of his adventures as Batman, and begins doubting his sanity – especially when he sees another "Batman" in action while on an outing with Selina.

Bruce meets with long-time confidante Leslie Thompkins. She tells him that his thoughts of being Batman are merely delusions, arising from his guilt and feelings of unworthiness at having such an easy life, with everything laid out for him. He starts to relax into that life, which appears to be everything he has ever wanted, until he discovers that the text in a newspaper and books from his library is a garbled, illegible mess.

Bruce heads to Gotham Cemetery, evading policemen who are attempting to take him into custody. A storm rises as he climbs a bell tower and finds himself face to face with Batman. Bruce demands answers, saying he knows he is in a dream world, as reading is a function of the right side of the brain, while dreams are entirely left-sided. The two struggle and Bruce unmasks the imposter as Jervis Tetch a.k.a. the Mad Hatter, who confirms Bruce's assertion. Bruce's secret identity has not been compromised, as this Tetch is also only a dream and the real Tetch cannot see into the dream world. "Tetch" claims there is no way for Bruce to escape the dream, but Bruce suspects there is one. He leaps from the belfry to his apparent death.

Bruce awakens back in the warehouse as Batman with Tetch's dream machine attached to his head. He escapes and overpowers the villain, demanding an explanation. Tetch tells him that his life has been ruined by Batman and he was trying to give him everything he wanted , i.e., a perfect life just so he would stay out of his. Batman turns him over to the police and leaves, facing reality once more.

Reception
"Perchance to Dream" is a very highly regarded episode of Batman: The Animated Series. It received a positive review and an "A−" mark from The A.V. Club. The Animated Batman refers to it as "an astonishing tour de force... the best episode of the series", and Retrojunk calls the battle between Bruce Wayne and Batman "one of the saddest and most humanistic conclusions in the history of animated television".

Kevin Conroy, the voice of Batman, considered this his favorite episode of the series. Troy Baker, who voices the character in the Lego and Telltale video games and their related cartoon specials, has also claimed this.

The basis for this episode can be found in the plotline of Detective Comics Volume 1, issue 633 (August, 1991). The elements of Bruce Wayne awakening are altered from the original comic book plot, but many elements including Bruce Wayne's prowess, his purchase and use of a rope and grappling hook, remain preserved in the animated episode.

References

External links
 

1992 American television episodes
Batman: The Animated Series episodes
Television episodes about dreams
Works by Joe R. Lansdale
Television episodes about simulated reality